Betania may refer to:

 Betania, Colombia, town and municipality in the Colombian department of Antioquia
 Betânia, Pernambuco, city in the state of Pernambuco, Brazil
 Betania, Chiapas, town and in Teopisca municipality, in Chiapas in southern Mexico
 Betania, Jalisco, town and in Ayotlán municipality, in Jalisco in central-western Mexico
 Betania, Kiribati, Betania is a settlement in Kiribati. It is located on the island of Tabuaeran
 Betania, Madagascar, coastal village in Western Madagascar south of Morondava
 Betania, Panama
 Betania, Venezuela, a small village that exists in the town of Cua, located in Miranda State, Venezuela
 Radio Betania, a local radio station serving the city of Pilar, Buenos Aires Province, Argentina
 Betânia do Piauí, municipality in the state of Piauí in the Northeast region of Brazil
 Betania Monastery, medieval Georgian Orthodox monastery in eastern Georgia

See also 
 Bethania (disambiguation)
 Bethany (disambiguation)
 Bettany (disambiguation)